Muhammed Batuhan Daştan (born 7 August 1997, Bursa) is a Turkish chess grandmaster.

Daştan earned FIDE titles as FIDE Master (FM) in 2012, International Master (IM) in 2013 and Grand Master (GM) in 2016. He is the tenth player to become a grandmaster in Turkish chess history.

References

External links 
 

1997 births
Living people
Turkish chess players
Chess grandmasters